Wolfgang Loitzl (born 13 January 1980) is an Austrian former ski jumper. He was the winner of the 2008–09 Four Hills Tournament and the 2009 Normal Hill World Champion.

Career
He won seven medals at the FIS Nordic World Ski Championships with seven golds (Individual normal hill: 2009, Team normal hill: 2001, 2005; Team large hill: 2005, 2007, 2009, 2013) and one bronze (Team large hill: 2001). He earned a bronze medal in the team event at the FIS Ski-Flying World Championships 2004 and finished 15th at the individual competition at those same championships. Loitzl has seven individual career victories from 1998 to 2003.

Loitzl won the 2008–09 Four Hills Tournament. In the final competition of the tournament in Bischofshofen, he received the maximum score (20) for the first jump from all five judges. In ski jumping history, only Anton Innauer (1976), Kazuyoshi Funaki (1998), Sven Hannawald (2003), Hideharu Miyahira (2003), and Peter Prevc (2015) have matched this feat.

On 21 February 2009 Loitzl won the individual gold on the normal hill at the World Championships at Liberec ahead of fellow Austrian Gregor Schlierenzauer and Switzerland's Simon Ammann. Further success followed on 28 February the same year when Loitzl won gold as part of the Austrian quartet in the team large hill event.

The following season, Loitzl won gold in the large hill team event at the 2010 Winter Olympics. He also won gold in the ski flying team event at the 2010 Ski Flying World Championships.

His son Benjamin was born on 12 January 2005, his second child Nikolas was born on 10 February 2007. He has been married to Marika since 11 June 2006.

Olympic Games

World Championships

Ski Flying World Championships

World Cup

Standings

Wins

External links 

  

1980 births
Living people
Austrian male ski jumpers
Ski jumpers at the 2002 Winter Olympics
Ski jumpers at the 2010 Winter Olympics
Olympic ski jumpers of Austria
Olympic gold medalists for Austria
Olympic medalists in ski jumping
People from Bad Ischl
FIS Nordic World Ski Championships medalists in ski jumping
Medalists at the 2010 Winter Olympics
Sportspeople from Upper Austria
21st-century Austrian people